Hyperthaema orbicularis is a moth of the subfamily Arctiinae. It was described by Peter Maassen in 1890. It is found in Colombia.

References

Phaegopterina
Moths described in 1890